Sichuan Minzu Football Club was a professional Chinese football club. The team was based in Chengdu, Sichuan.

History
Sichuan Huakun F.C. was founded on 1 July 2020. The club participated in Chinese Champions League in 2020 and was promoted to China League Two. In 2021, the club changed its name to Sichuan Minzu F.C.

Sichuan Minzu was dissolved after the 2021 season.

Name history
2020 Sichuan Huakun F.C. 四川华昆
2021 Sichuan Minzu F.C. 四川民足

References

External links
Soccerway

Sichuan Minzu F.C.
Defunct football clubs in China
Association football clubs established in 2020
Association football clubs disestablished in 2022
Sport in Sichuan
2020 establishments in China
2022 disestablishments in China